A persulfate (sometimes known as peroxysulfate or peroxodisulfate) is a compound containing the anions  or . In both cases, sulfur adopts the normal tetrahedral geometry typical for the S(VI) oxidation state. These salts are strong oxidizers.

Ions
 Peroxomonosulfate ion, 
 Peroxydisulfate

Acids
 Peroxymonosulfuric acid  (Caro's acid), H2SO5
 Peroxydisulfuric acid, H2S2O8

Example salts
 Sodium peroxomonosulfate, Na2SO5
 Potassium peroxymonosulfate, KHSO5
 Sodium persulfate (sodium peroxydisulfate), Na2S2O8
 Ammonium persulfate (ammonium peroxydisulfate), (NH4)2S2O8
 Potassium persulfate (potassium peroxydisulfate), K2S2O8

References 

Sulfur oxyanions
Preservatives